Peeninga is a hundred within the County of Chandos, South Australia established in 1912.

History
The traditional owners of the land are the Ngargad Australian Aboriginal tribes.

See also
 Lands administrative divisions of South Australia

References

Peebinga